is a former Japanese football player. He played for Japan national team.

Club career
Maeda was born in Fukuoka on September 5, 1965. After graduating from Tokai University, he joined All Nippon Airways (later Yokohama Flügels) in 1988. In First season, the club won the 2nd place and he was selected Best Eleven. In 1993, the club won Emperor's Cup. In Asia, the club won 1994–95 Asian Cup Winners' Cup and 1995 Asian Super Cup. He retired in 1996.

National team career
On January 27, 1988, Maeda debuted for Japan national team against United Arab Emirates. He played as regular player, and also played at 1990 World Cup qualification. He played 14 games and scored 6 goals for Japan until 1989.

Club statistics

National team statistics

References

External links

Japan National Football Team Database

1965 births
Living people
Tokai University alumni
Association football people from Fukuoka Prefecture
Japanese footballers
Japan international footballers
Japan Soccer League players
J1 League players
Yokohama Flügels players
1988 AFC Asian Cup players
Sportspeople from Fukuoka (city)
Association football forwards